Lisbon Town Hall is a historic town hall building located in the Town of Lisbon in St. Lawrence County, New York. It was built in 1889 and is a large frame barn like structure with Queen Anne style decoration.  It is a -story building with an exposed basement of local stone and a gambrel roof.

It was listed on the National Register of Historic Places in 1980.

References

City and town halls on the National Register of Historic Places in New York (state)
Queen Anne architecture in New York (state)
Government buildings completed in 1889
Buildings and structures in St. Lawrence County, New York
National Register of Historic Places in St. Lawrence County, New York
1889 establishments in New York (state)